Take the Kids Off Broadway is the second studio album and major debut release by the American indie rock band Foxygen, released through Jagjaguwar on July 24, 2012. The album was preceded by the release of the album's only single, "Make It Known," in May 2012.

Track listing

Personnel

Foxygen
Sam France – vocals, guitar, piano, horns; mixing (track 1, 4)
Jon Rado – all other instruments; mixing (track 1, 4)

Musicians and personnel
Richard Swift – mixing (track 2, 3, 5, 6, 7)
TW Walsh – mastering
Onasis – artwork
Justin Nijssen – bass (track 5), vocals (track 4)
Jaclyn Cohen – vocals

References

External links
Take The Kids Off Broadway (Jagjaguwar) – bandcamp

2011 albums
Foxygen albums
Jagjaguwar albums
Albums produced by Richard Swift (singer-songwriter)
Albums produced by Jonathan Rado